Sakharpuda is the Maharashtrian Engagement ceremony. The correct name of the ceremony "Rupaya Naral - Sakharpuda". It is also known as "Waangnischay" which literally means verbal agreement.

Sakhar means sugar and puda means a packet or box. In this ceremony, the prospective bridegroom's parents give a packet of sugar to the bride, while the bride's parents give a coconut and coin to the prospective bridegroom. This signifies a solemn promise by both the parents to give their children in marriage to the other.

On this occasion some people arrange party in Maharastrian style mean shira-bhat or kurma puri. This is one of the important ceremony before engagement.

Sakharpuda, a pre-wedding ceremony, involves the exchange of a packet of sugar between the families of the prospective bride and groom. In this ceremony, the groom's parents present a sari to the bride. This symbolizes that the girl has been accepted in the groom's family. Her hands are accessorized with green bangles. Sometimes the couple exchanges rings too. Traditionally the families wait to print and send the wedding invites only after the Sakharpuda.

References

Culture of Maharashtra
Indian wedding traditions